Halfaxa is the second studio album by Canadian electronic music artist Grimes. It was released in Canada on October 5, 2010, by Arbutus Records, and in the United Kingdom and mainland Europe in May 2011 by Lo Recordings.

Background 
While making this album, Claire Boucher was making tons of music and most of the times the music reflected the opposite of how she felt. The album is mostly inspired by her time in Halifax, Nova Scotia while staying at her friend's home.

Composition 
Halfaxa has been described as a goth-pop, witch house, dark wave, and glo-fi release, as well as featuring influences of glitch pop, R&B, techno, industrial, and electro. Grimes has said Halfaxa was created to "evoke the feeling of believing in God in a very Medieval Christian way", and has described it as her "medieval" album.

Track listing

Notes
 On the Lo Recordings version, the tracks: 1, 2, 4, 6 are stylised in lowercase and 9, 10 are stylised as "Dreamfortress" and "world♡princess."
 On some digital releases, "∆∆∆∆Rasik∆∆∆∆" is simply titled "rasik".

Personnel
Credits adapted from the liner notes of Halfaxa.

 Grimes – vocals, production, composition, illustrations
 Jasper Baydala – design
 Sebastian Cowan – mastering 
 Antony Ryan – mastering

Release history

References

External links
 Halfaxa at Arbutus Records

2010 albums
Grimes albums
Arbutus Records albums
Witch house (genre) albums
Dark wave albums
Psychedelic music albums by Canadian artists